Nihat Eski (born 24 July 1963 in Tosya, Turkey) is a Dutch politician of Turkish descent. He is a member of the Christian Democratic Appeal.

References

External links
Official website

1963 births
Living people
Christian Democratic Appeal politicians
Dutch people of Turkish descent
Dutch trade unionists
Members of the House of Representatives (Netherlands)
People from Tosya
University of Amsterdam alumni
21st-century Dutch politicians